Suraag – The Clue is an Indian television detective-crime drama series that aired on DD National from 1999. The series, starring Sudesh Berry as CID Inspector Bharat in the main lead, was directed by Gautam Adhikari and produced by Shri Adhikari Brothers Limited.

In the drama, Inspector Bharat and his assistant Inspector Nitin Srivastav formed a formidable partnership in solving crimes, mostly murder mysteries. This series, unlike previous detective-crime dramas in India, involved tackling of one case every episode and seldom were the story or case of one episode continued to the next one. Umesh AN was the producer.

After the drama ended, a new series called CID Officer (with same crew and cast) was aired on the same time. It was described by the media as "unofficial extension" of the Suraag.

Cast

Main 
 Sudesh Berry as CID Inspector Bharat

Guest 
 Phalguni Parekh as Shivani (Episode 1)
 Vishnu Sharma (Episode 1)
 Ramesh Tiwari as 
 (Episode 1)
 (Episode 15)
 Arun Bali as 
 Hariram (Episode 2)
 (Episode 21)
 Arvind Ahuja (Episode 28)
 Amita Khopkar (Episode 2)
 Shailendra Srivastav (Episode 2)
  Manoj Joshi (Episode 3)
 Makrand Deshpande (Episode 3)
 Nasir Sheikh (Episode 3)
 Savita Prabhune (Episode 4)
 Kuldeep Mallik as 
 (Episode 4)
 (Episode 19)
 (Episode 29)
 Reena Kapoor (Episode 4)
 Hemant Choudhary (Episode 4)
 Mahaveer Shah (Episode 4)
  Imran Khan as 
 (Episode 5)
 Rakesh (Episode 20)
 Raza Murad (Episode 5)
 Ragesh Asthana (Episode 5)
 Jitendra Trehan as 
 (Episode 5)
 (Episode 20)
 Deepshikha Nagpal as Inspector Sneha Verma (Episode 6)
 Rishabh Shukla as 
 (Episode 6)
 Dr. Amarkant Ahuja (Episode 19)
 Anil Dhawan as 
 Vishal Grover (Episode 7)
 Krishnakant (Episode 30)
 Navni Parihar as Kamini Vishal Grover (Episode 7)
 Dinesh Kaushik as
 (Episode 7)
 (Episode 27)
 Rajlakshmi Solanki (Episode 7)
 Akhil Ghai (Episode 7)
 Suhas Khandke as 
 (Episode 7)
 (Episode 11)
 Afshan Khan (Episode 8)
 Anjana Mumtaz (Episode 8)
 Vijay Aidasani as
 (Episode 9)
 (Episode 34)
 Sudha Chandran (Episode 9)
 Pramatesh Mehta (Episode 9)
 Meenakshi Verma (Episode 10)
 Vijayendra Ghatge (Episode 11)
 Kiran Juneja (Episode 11)
 Utkarsha Naik (Episode 11)
 Raju Kher (Episode 12)
 Dilip Thadeshwar (Episode 12)
 Jaya Bhattacharya (Episode 12)
 Goga Kapoor (Episode 12)
 Murli Sharma (Episode 12)
 Mac Mohan (Episode 12)
 Santosh Shukla as
 (Episode 13)
 Vijay (Episode 20)
 Suraj Thapar (Episode 13)
 Prashant Bhatt (Episode 13)
  Sudhir as
 (Episode 13)
 (Episode 26)
 Tasneem Sheikh as Ritu Chaudhary (Episode 14)
 Sumeet Saigal (Episode 14)
 Achyut Potdar (Episode 14)
 Navin Nischol (Episode 14)
 Sujata Thakkar as
 (Episode 14)
 (Episode 23)
 Sunil Nagar as
 (Episode 15)
 Dr. Alok Srivastav (Episode 34)
 Tinnu Anand (Episode 16)
 Rammohan Sharma (Episode 16)
 Deepak Parashar (Episode 17)
 Pramod Moutho (Episode 18)
 Bob Christo (Episode 20)
 Brownie Parashar (Episode 20)
 Beena Banerjee (Episode 20)
 Kishwar Merchant as Mandira (Episode 20)
 Pradeep Shukla (Episode 20)
 Kamal Adib (Episode 20)
  Javed Khan as Rajeshwar (Episode 20)
 Adarsh Gautam as 
 Raj Malhotra (Episode 22)
 Dinesh Prabhakar (Episode 33)
 Usha Bachani (Episode 22)
 Barkha Madan as
 (Episode 23)
 (Episode 35)
 Raymon Singh (Episode 23)
 Dharmesh Vyas (Episode 23)
 Girija Shankar (Episode 24)
 Vaishnavi Mahant (Episode 26)
 Dinesh Hingoo (Episode 26)
 Rajeev Verma (Episode 27)
 Ali Khan as Ranjeet (Episode 28)
 Lalit Parimoo as Shivam Karmarkar (Episode 28)
 Sheeba Agarwal as Neelam (Episode 30)
 Subbiraj Kakkar as Narendra Kapoor (Episode 31)
 Rio Kapadia as Jasvendra Kapoor (Episode 31)
 Seema Kapoor (Episode 31)
 Ajit Mehra as Shyam Hemchandani (Episode 31)
 Rohini Hattangadi as Judge Sangeeta Choudhary (Episode 32)
 Anita Hassanandani as Natasha Choudhary (Episode 32)
 Pradeep Kabra (Episode 32)
 Jaya Mathur (Episode 34)
 Shashi Sharma (Episode 34)
  Nawab Shah (Episode 34)
 Kamal Malik (Episode 35)
 Rajesh Puri (Episode 35)
 Firdaus Mevawala (Episode 35)

References

External links

DD National original programming
Indian crime television series
Indian television series
Detective television series
Hindi-language television shows
1999 Indian television series debuts
1999 Indian television series endings